The year 1973 in television involved some significant events. Below is a list of television-related events in that year.

Events
January 4 – The record breaking, long-running comedy series in the United Kingdom and the world, Last of the Summer Wine, starts as a 30-minute pilot on BBC1's Comedy Playhouse show. The first series starts on November 12; the 295th and last episode is broadcast on 29 August 2010.
January 12 – Family Affair airs for the final time, in daytime reruns on CBS in the United States. Reruns will later eventually moved to syndication.
January 13 – The Lawrence Welk Show airs its Salute to Mexico episode where Anacani makes her debut with the Champagne Music Makers. That episode also marks the final time Sandi Griffiths and Sally Flynn appear together as the act of Sandi & Sally
January 14 – Elvis Presley's Aloha from Hawaii via Satellite television special is seen around the world by over 1 billion viewers, setting a record as the most-watched broadcast by an individual entertainer in television history. It is broadcast live to Asia and Oceania, with a delay to Europe, and in April to the United States and Brazil. In the UK, it wasn’t shown until March 5, 1978 on BBC1. However, it is not shown in Eastern Bloc countries because of communist censorship, with the sole exception of Der schwarze Kanal on Deutscher Fernsehfunk in East Germany.
January 15 – For a brief attempt to stop rerunning primetime shows from 1973 to 1975, Vin Scully's eponymous talk show debuts on the air on CBS.
March 8 – The TV movie The Marcus-Nelson Murders airs on CBS. This serves as the pilot for the iconic crime drama series Kojak, which returns as a weekly series in October. 
March 13 – The TV movie Hawkins: Death and the Maiden airs on CBS. This serves as the pilot for the James Stewart legal drama and murder mystery series Hawkins, which returns as a weekly series in October. 
March 21 – Sitcom Are You Being Served? begins its first regular series on BBC1 in the U.K. (pilot aired September 8, 1972).
March 23 – The longest running daytime game show to date — NBC's Concentration — airs its 3,796th and final show, after a run of fourteen years and seven months. The record will be eclipsed in 1987 by The Price Is Right; Concentration ranks fourth in continual longevity among all daytime/syndicated game shows. Also on the same day, CBS aired the final episodes of the soaps that started in the late 1960s, Where the Heart Is and Love is a Many Splendored Thing on the daytime lineup.
March 25 – The pilot episode of Open All Hours airs as part of Ronnie Barker's series Seven of One on BBC1 in the U.K.
March 26 – NBC debuts Baffle, one of the first projects Lin Bolen greenlit for the daytime schedule. Also on the same day, CBS debuts The $10,000 Pyramid and The Young and the Restless on the lineup, and The Price is Right moved to afternoons (it will eventually come back to the mornings permanently in August 1975). As for The Young and the Restless, it will kick out Jeopardy! in the ratings, moving it from the noon to the mornings by January 1974.
April 1 – "Prisoner and Escort", the pilot episode of Porridge, airs as part of Seven of One.
April 16 – James Paul McCartney airs on ABC (and on ITV in the U.K. on May 10).
May 10 – ABC concludes its first run at broadcasting the National Basketball Association with the New York Knicks' Finals clinching victory over the Los Angeles Lakers in Game 5. With CBS taking over as the NBA's network television partner, this would mark the last time that ABC would broadcast an NBA Finals for 30 years.
May 17 – U.S. daytime television is interrupted by the Watergate hearings, which would continue until August 7. Each network airs coverage in rotation every third day (ABC is first, then CBS and NBC).
July 2 – U.S. game show Match Game debuts its 1970s version; it soon becomes the #1-rated daytime television program for 1973, 1974, and 1975, as well as #1 game show from 1973 to 1977.
August 6 – James Beck, who stars as Private Walker in the popular U.K. sitcom Dad's Army, dies of a burst pancreas at the age of just 44. Although the series continues until 1977, the part of Walker is not recast and the show carries on without him.
August 11 – Programme One airs the first part of the Soviet television miniseries Seventeen Moments of Spring, which would run until the 24th. With an audience of between fifty and eighty million viewers per episode, it becomes the most successful television show of its time in the Soviet Union.
August 17 – CBS presents an adaptation of David Rabe's play Sticks and Bones...but only to about half of its affiliates.
September 15 – Betty White makes her first appearance as Sue Ann Nivens in The Mary Tyler Moore Show'''s fourth season opener, "The Lars Affair".
September 20 – The Battle of the Sexes: Billie Jean King defeats Bobby Riggs in a televised tennis match at the Astrodome in Houston, Texas. The global television audience in 36 countries is estimated at 90 million.
October 8
Pat Phoenix leaves the role of Elsie Tanner on Coronation Street after thirteen years, when she felt that specific length of time was enough to play one character continuously.
Telefe Mar del Plata is taken over by the Peronist government of Argentina.
October 20 – George Jefferson (Sherman Hemsley) makes his first appearance on All in the Family, at his brother Henry's goodbye party, though he has lived next door to Archie Bunker for the past two years.
November 4 – Filipino television network Banahaw Broadcasting Corporation officially signs on the air using Channel 2 frequency (owned by ABS-CBN), which was shut down by President Ferdinand Marcos more than one year ago.
November 12 – The record breaking, long-running comedy series in the U.K. and the world, Last of the Summer Wine starts as a series on BBC1 (the pilot had aired on January 4). The 295th and last episode is broadcast on 29 August 2010.
November 20 – A Charlie Brown Thanksgiving airs on CBS for the first time.  It will go onto win an Emmy Award the following year.
November 23 – Julie on Sesame Street, starring Julie Andrews, airs on ABC.
November – Color television is launched in New Zealand. (It will go full-time in November 1975).
December 12 – Kojak's trademark lollipop makes its debut in the episode "Hot Sunday".
December 19 – After reading a news item that said the federal government had fallen behind in getting bids to supply toilet tissue, Johnny Carson inadvertently triggers an unprecedented three-week panic when he announces, on The Tonight Show, that there is an acute shortage of toilet paper in the U.S.

Programs/programmes60 Minutes (1968–)About Safety (1972–1973)All in the Family (1971–79)All My Children (1970–2011)American Bandstand (1952–89)Another World (1964–99)Are You Being Served? (UK) (1972–85)As the World Turns (1956–2010)Blue Peter (UK) (1958–)Bonanza (1959–73)Bozo the Clown (1949–)Candid Camera (1948–)Captain Kangaroo (1955–84)Colditz (UK) (1972–74)Columbo (1971–78)Come Dancing (UK) (1949–95)Concentration (1958–78)Coronation Street (UK) (1960–)Crossroads (UK) (1964–88, 2001–03)Dad's Army (UK) (1968–77)Days of Our Lives (1965–)Dixon of Dock Green (UK) (1955–76)Doctor Who (UK) (1963–89, 1996, 2005–)Emergency! (1972–77)Emmerdale Farm (UK) (1972–)Face the Nation (1954–)Fat Albert and the Cosby Kids (1972–84)Four Corners (Australia) (1961–)General Hospital (1963–)Grandstand (UK) (1958–2007)Gunsmoke (1955–75)Hallmark Hall of Fame (1951–)Hawaii Five-O (1968–80)Hee Haw (1969–93)Here's Lucy (1968–74)I've Got a Secret (1972–73)Ironside (1967–75)It's Academic (1961–)Jeopardy! (1964–75, 1984–)John Craven's Newsround (UK) (1972–)Kimba the White Lion (1966–67), re-runsKung Fu (1972–75)Love of Life (1951–80)Love, American Style (1969–74)Magpie (UK) (1968–80)Mannix (1967–75)Marcus Welby, M.D. (1969–76)Mary Tyler Moore (1970–77)M*A*S*H (1972–83)Masterpiece Theatre (1971–)Maude (1972–78)McCloud (1970–77)McMillan & Wife (1971–77)Meet the Press (1947–)Monday Night Football (1970–)Monty Python's Flying Circus (1969–74)Old Grey Whistle Test (UK) (1971–87)One Life to Live (1968–2012)Opportunity Knocks (UK) (1956–78)Panorama (UK) (1953–)Play for Today (UK) (1970–84)Play School (1966–)Police Story (1973–78)Rainbow (1972–92)Room 222 (1969–74)Sanford and Son (1972–77)Search for Tomorrow (1951–86)Sesame Street (1969–)Soul Train (1971–2006) The Benny Hill Show (UK) (1969–89)The Bob Newhart Show (1972–78)The Brady Bunch (1969–74)The Carol Burnett Show (1967–78)The Dean Martin Show (1965–19)The Doctors (1963–82)The Edge of Night (1956–84)The Flip Wilson Show (1970–74)The Good Old Days (UK) (1953–83)The Guiding Light (1952–2009)The Late Late Show (Ireland) (1962–)The Lawrence Welk Show (1955–82)The Mike Douglas Show (1961–81)The Money Programme (UK) (1966–)The New Dick Van Dyke Show (1971–74)The Newlywed Game (1966–74)The Odd Couple (1970–75)The Partridge Family (1970–74)The Price Is Right (1972–)The Secret Storm (1954–74)The Sky at Night (UK) (1957–)The Sonny & Cher Comedy Hour (1971–74)The Today Show (1952–)The Tonight Show Starring Johnny Carson (1962–92)The Waltons (1972–81)The Wonderful World of Disney (1969–79)This Is Your Life (UK) (1955–2003)To Tell the Truth (1956–68; 1969–78)Top of the Pops (UK) (1964–2006)Truth or Consequences (1950–88)What the Papers Say (UK) (1956–)What's My Line (1950–75)World of Sport (UK) (1965–85)Z-Cars (UK) (1962–78)

Debuts
January 4 – Last of the Summer Wine pilot episode, first series begins on November 12 (1973–2010)
January 6 – Schoolhouse Rock! on ABC (1973–09)
January 28 – Barnaby Jones on CBS (1973–80)
March 20 – Police Story on NBC (1973–78)
March 26 The Young and the Restless on CBS (1973–)The $10,000 Pyramid on CBS with Dick Clark as host
April 6 – Ultraman Taro on TBS in Japan (1973–74)
July 2 – CBS revives Match Game with more ribald questions (1962–69, 1973–84, 1990–91, 1998–99)
July 17 The Wizard of Odds, first United States game show hosted by Alex Trebek, premieres on NBCThe New Treasure Hunt (syndicated 1973–76)
September 8 
An animated revival of Star Trek premieres on NBC (1973–74) Super Friends (1973–74) premieres on ABC
September 10 – Lotsa Luck on NBC (1973–74)
September 14 – Adam's Rib on ABC (1973)
September 21 - Needles and Pins on NBC (1973)
September 22 – The Starlost (1973–74)
October 2 – Hawkins on CBS (1973–74)
October 3 – Love Story on NBC (1973–74)
October 15 – The Tomorrow Show on NBC (1973–82)
October 24 – Kojak on CBS (1973–78, 2005)Superstars on BBC1 in the UK  (1973–85, 2003–05)Greatest Sports Legends'' (syndicated 1973–93)

Ending this year

Births

Deaths

See also
 1973–74 United States network television schedule